Liga Deportiva Universitaria de Quito's 1999 season was the club's 69th year of existence, the 46th year in professional football, and the 39th in the top level of professional football in Ecuador.

Kits
Supplier: Umbro
Sponsor(s): La Lechera, Crunch, Ecuatoriana

Squad

Competitions

Serie A

First stage

Results

Second stage

Group 2

Results

Liguilla Final

Results

Finals

Results

Copa Libertadores

Copa Libertadores squad

First stage

Round of 16

River Plate and LDU Quito were tied on points and goal difference.  River Plate advanced on penalty kicks.

References
RSSSF - 1999 Serie A

External links
Official website 
LDU Quito (4) - Delfín (0) 2nd goal
LDU Quito (3) - Emelec (1) 3rd goal
LDU Quito (3) - Barcelona SC (2) 1st goal
LDU Quito (3) - Barcelona SC (2) 2nd goal
LDU Quito (3) - Barcelona SC (2) 3rd goal
LDU Quito (1) - Olmedo (0)
ESPOLI (1) - LDU Quito (4) 2nd goal
LDU Quito (1) - El Nacional (0)
El Nacional (1) - LDU Quito (3)

1999